The Valdostan regional election of 1949 took place on 24 April 1949. The National Liberation Committee of Italy had granted in 1946 a special autonomy to Aosta Valley, later confirmed by the Italian Constitution of 1948.

Results
Electoral system: limited voting (jackpot for winners: 28 seats)

Sources: Regional Council of Aosta Valley and Istituto Cattaneo

References

Elections in Aosta Valley
1949 elections in Italy